West County may refer to

Contra Costa County, California#West County, the area near or on San Francisco and San Pablo bays
West County, a name for the western part of St. Louis County, Missouri used by residents of the Greater St. Louis area of Missouri and Illinois

See also
Dublin County West (Dáil constituency), a short-lived parliamentary constituency represented in Dáil Éireann, the lower house of the Irish parliament
West County Center, a shopping mall located in Des Peres, Missouri.
West County Trail, an electric interurban railway in Sonoma County, California, United States